Etuini Talakai, known also by his anglicised name Edwin Talakai (born 1 October 1973) is a Tongan former rugby union player who played as prop.

Career
Talakai debuted for Tonga on 29 May 1993, during a match against Western Samoa at Nuku'alofa. He was present in the 'Ikale Tahi squad for the 1995 Rugby World Cup, playing two matches against Scotland and Ivory Coast. His last test cap for Tonga was against Fiji, in Suva, on 15 July 1995. He also played for Hawke's Bay and for Auckland in the National Provincial Championship.

References

External links
Etuini Talakai at ESPN Scrum
Edwin L. Talakai at New Zealand Rugby History

1971 births
Living people
Tongan expatriates in New Zealand
Tongan rugby union players
Tonga international rugby union players
Rugby union props